The Fall of a Saint is a 1920 British silent crime film directed by W. P. Kellino and starring Josephine Earle, Gerald Lawrence, and Dallas Anderson. It was based on a novel by Eric Clement Scott, and made at Lime Grove Studios in Shepherd's Bush.

Cast
 Josephine Earle as Countess de la Merthe 
 Gerald Lawrence as Claude Maitland 
 Dallas Anderson as Count de la Merthe 
 W.T. Ellwanger as Elkin Smith 
 R. Heaton Grey as Lord Norten 
 Reginald Culhane as Sport Kenkinson 
 Thea Godfrey as Katie Thimm

References

Bibliography
 Low, Rachael. History of the British Film, 1918–1929. George Allen & Unwin, 1971.

1920 films
1920 crime films
British crime films
British silent feature films
Films based on British novels
Films directed by W. P. Kellino
Films shot at Lime Grove Studios
British black-and-white films
1920s English-language films
1920s British films